Uzundal is a village in the Hozat District, Tunceli Province, Turkey. The village is populated by Kurds of the Bahtiyar tribe and had a population of 10 in 2021.

The hamlet of Bulgurlu is attached to the village.

References 

Kurdish settlements in Tunceli Province
Villages in Hozat District